Valy Arnheim (born Valentin Theodor Woldemar Appel; 8 June 1883 – 11 November 1950) was a German film actor and director.

Selected filmography
 Lightning Command (1921)
 Anne-Liese of Dessau (1925)
 Harry Hill's Deadly Hunt (1925)
 Volga Volga (1928)
 Girls, Beware! (1928)
 Life's Circus (1928)
 Indizienbeweis (1929)
 Spring Awakening (1929)
 Black Forest Girl (1929)
 The Hound of the Baskervilles (1929)
 The Woman Without Nerves (1930)
 Bombs on Monte Carlo (1931)
 Different Morals (1931)
 The Emperor's Sweetheart (1931)
 Circus Life (1931)
 Tannenberg (1932)
 The Private Life of Louis XIV (1935)
 His Late Excellency (1935)
 City of Anatol (1936)
 The Castle in Flanders (1936)
 Diamonds (1937)
 Men Without a Fatherland (1937)
 The Mystery of Betty Bonn (1938)
 Five Million Look for an Heir (1938)
 The Night With the Emperor (1936)
 My Aunt, Your Aunt (1939)
 The Governor (1939)
 The Three Codonas (1940)
 Andreas Schlüter (1942)
 Munchausen (1943)
 Wozzeck (1947)
 The Court Concert (1948)

References

External links
 

1883 births
1950 deaths
People from Bernburg
People from the Duchy of Anhalt
German male film actors
German male silent film actors
20th-century German male actors